The Havelsan Barkan is a prototype of a Turkish unmanned ground combat vehicle developed by HAVELSAN for the needs of the Turkish Land Forces and the law enforcement forces.

Barkan features a remote controlled weapon station, electro-optical sensors and many data links. It was introduced to the public end February 2021.

References

Unmanned ground combat vehicles of Turkey
Tracked armoured fighting vehicles